Roksana Rubenovna Babajan (born May 30, 1946, Tashkent, Uzbek SSR, USSR) is a Soviet and Russian pop singer and actress. People's Artist of the Russian Federation (1999). Active participant in the protection of homeless animals, President of the Russian League for the Protection of Animals.

Biography 
Roksana Babajan was born May 30, 1946 in Tashkent in the family of engineer Ruben Mikhailovich Mukurdumov and singer and pianist Seda Grigorievna Babajan.

In 1970 she graduated from the Tashkent Institute of Railway Transport Engineers, Faculty of Industrial and Civil Engineering (ASG). Studying at the institute, she participated in amateur performances, taking prizes at singing competitions. In the year graduating from the university, the head of the State Variety Orchestra of Armenia, People's Artist of the USSR Konstantin Orbelyan invited Roksana to her orchestra, to Yerevan, where she later became a professional singer. Since 1973 (according to other sources since 1975) Roxana becomes a soloist of the VIA Blue Guitars.

The turning point in the career was the participation in the International Festival of Internationales Schlagerfestival Dresden on September 16–19, 1976 in the GDR. Despite the very strong composition of the contestants and the constant sympathy of the German jury to their performers from the GDR (in 9 of the 17 festivals they were the winnersу), Babajan was able to win.

In 1983 she graduated from the administrative and economic faculty of the GITIS.

A new period of popularity came from the late 1980s, when Babayan annually appeared in the finals of the festival Pesnya Goda from 1988 to 1996.

The widow of People's Artist of the RSFSR Mikhail Derzhavin (1936–2018), with whom he was married since 1980.

Member of the Russian political party United Russia.

Discography 

 2014 —  Formula of Happiness (CD)
 1996 —  Enchantment Witchcraft (CD)
 1991 —  Another Woman (Vinyl)
 1984 —  When We Are Together (Vinyl)

References

External links

Living people
1946 births
Musicians from Tashkent
Soviet women singers
Soviet actresses
Russian actresses
Honored Artists of the RSFSR
People's Artists of Russia
Russian Academy of Theatre Arts alumni
United Russia politicians
Russian people of Armenian descent
Uzbekistani people of Armenian descent
20th-century Russian women singers
20th-century Russian singers
Animal welfare workers